The Serbian Movement "Dveri", commonly just known as Dveri, is a nationalist and right-wing populist political party in Serbia. It its currently led by Boško Obradović, who is one of the co-founders of the party.

Formed as a youth-orientated political organization in 1999, it published an eponymous student magazine that promoted clerical and nationalist content. Through the 2000s, it operated as a non-governmental organization that campaigned in favor of Christian right views, that included opposition to abortion and opposition to gay rights. Dveri took part in the 2012 elections where it failed to obtain any seats in the National Assembly, although in the 2016 elections it entered the National Assembly in a joint list with the Democratic Party of Serbia (DSS), obtaining 13 seats in total, 7 of which belonged to Dveri. Two years later, it took part in the 2018 Belgrade City Assembly election in a coalition with the Enough is Enough (DJB) but failed to win seats. 

It joined the opposition Alliance for Serbia (SzS) later that year, and became a prominent voice in the alliance, with whom it boycotted the 2020 parliamentary election. It did not take part in its successor alliance, the United Opposition of Serbia (UOPS), but remained independent during the course of 2021, after which it formed an electoral coalition with Žika Gojković's faction of the Movement for the Restoration of the Kingdom of Serbia (POKS) for the 2022 general election. It returned to the National Assembly after the 2022 election, winning 6 seats.

History

Organization (1999–2011) 
Dveri were founded by Branimir Nešić in 1999 as a Christian right-wing youth organisation consisting mainly of students from the University of Belgrade which regularly arranged public debates devoted to the popularisation of clerical-nationalist philosophy of Nikolaj Velimirović, a bishop of the Serbian Orthodox Church who was canonized in 2003 and is considered a major anti-Western thinker.

The organization promotes a pronounced Serbian nationalist ideology. Based on the assessment of partiality and lack of condemnation of crimes by another ethnicity, Dveri opposed a resolution passed by the Serbian parliament in March 2010 which condemned the Srebrenica massacre committed by the Bosnian Serb Army in eastern Bosnia in 1995,. Dveri also fiercely oppose unilateral proclamation of independence of Kosovo. It is also well known for its opposition to gay rights.

In October 2010 the very first Gay Pride parade was held in Belgrade, in which thousands of anti-gay protesters clashed violently with police units securing the parade participants. One of the far-right groups which organized the anti-gay protest were Dveri, and a member of the organization was quoted by The Economist as saying that the protest was a form of "defense of the family and the future of the Serbian people".

In August 2011, in the run up to the 2011 Pride Parade in Belgrade, the organisation warned that organising such an event could feed social unrest and provoke riots, and added that if the government allowed the march to go forward that "Belgrade will burn like London burned recently". In fear of more violent clashes, the authorities eventually decided to cancel the event, a decision which was criticised by human rights groups such as Amnesty International, which specifically singled out Dveri and Obraz as the main right-wing nationalist groups responsible for "orchestrating opposition to the Pride".

Citizen's group (2011–2015) 

In March 2012 the movement collected 14,507 signatures to register as an electoral list for the May 2012 Serbian parliamentary election. The Dveri Movement received 4.35% of the popular vote, failing to pass the 5% minimum threshold to enter parliament.

In September 2012 Dveri leader Vladan Glišić called for a "100-year ban" on pride parades in Belgrade, describing such an event as "promotion of a totalitarian and destructive ideology" and accused the ruling Socialist Party of Serbia of being influenced by a "gay lobby".

In September 2013, in the run-up to another attempted gay pride march in Belgrade, Boško Obradović said that the event amounted to "the imposition of foreign and unsuitable values, laid out before minors - the most vulnerable section of society".

In 2014, the eurosceptic Democratic Party of Serbia of ex-Prime Minister Vojislav Koštunica was considering options about the formation of a "Patriotic Bloc" which would stand up to the political elite's dominating pro-EU stance, the coalition being called forth by the Dveri (with the Serbian Radical Party mentioned as a potential third coalition partner) movement. However, DSS initially rejected the proposal, stating that the proposed parties did not fully embrace DSS positions and that they merely want to join to enter the parliament.
Dveri again ran alone in the March 2014 Serbian parliamentary election, winning 3.58% of the vote, failing again to pass the 5% minimum threshold to enter parliament. They were characterized by many as a far-right party at this point of time.

Modern period (2015–present) 

In November 2014 Dveri and the Democratic Party of Serbia declared that they would contest the next elections as the "Patriotic Bloc" alliance. In January 2015 PULS and the SLS also joined the bloc. Parliamentary elections were held on 24 April 2016, in which the "Patriotic Bloc" won 5.04% of the vote (13 seats, of which Dveri had 7). After this election, for the first time in history, they became a parliamentary party.

Dveri announced on 3 September 2016 that Boško Obradović, the president of Dveri, will be their candidate on the 2017 presidential election. On 10 March, Boško Obradović submitted his signatures for the candidacy to RIK. In the end, he only got 2.16% of the vote on the presidential election.

In 2018, local elections were held in Belgrade and Bor on 4 March. Dveri announced that they will be forming a coalition with Enough is Enough under the name "Dosta je Bilo i Dveri - Da ovi odu, a da se oni ne vrate". In Belgrade, the coalition won 3.89% of the vote, while in Bor they won 8.17% of the vote (3 seats). Local elections were also held in Lučani on 16 December 2018. They participated with the coalition Alliance for Serbia and they won 9.57% of the vote (4 seats). Local elections were also held on the same day in Kladovo, Doljevac, and Kula but Dveri and other parties from Alliance for Serbia boycotted those elections.

In 2018 they were one of the founding members of the catch-all opposition Alliance for Serbia which boycotted the 2020 parliamentary election. In October 2018, a controversy sparked around the member Srđan Nogo who said that "Ana Brnabić and Aleksandar Vučić should be publicly hanged". Other members of Dveri including the president Boško Obradović opposed this and in early 2019 he was expelled from the party. During the entire existence of the Alliance for Serbia, they were the only eurosceptic party (besides Healthy Serbia who left in early 2020). The coalition was dissolved in August 2020 after an agreement to form a wider coalition of opposition parties called United Opposition of Serbia in which Dveri decided to not participate. In late September, Dveri announced their new political program called "Promena sistema - sigurnost za sve" which was showcased to the public until the end of 2020. In this new program, Dveri claimed to have adopted environmentalism and Christian democracy as their ideologies.

Together with the People's Party, Serbian Party Oathkeepers, and New Democratic Party of Serbia, it signed a joint declaration for the "reintegration of Kosovo into the constitutional and legal order of Serbia" in October 2022. In November 2022, Dveri published a text in which it said that "in vitro fertilization with donated reproductive material from Spain and Denmark could affect the change of genome of Serbs", a statement which was condemned by opposition and government parties.

Political positions 

Dveri was initially orientated towards Christian fundamentalism, clerical-fascism, and ultranationalism. Its ideology was also described as fascist, and antisemitic. During its foundation, Dveri published books and magazines with clerical and nationalist content. It has also campaigned against abortion. Since its foundation, Dveri has been supportive of Christian right views and monarchism. Scholars have also described its ideological stances as xenophobic, due to their Christian right stances. It has also been known as a staunch opponent of gay rights.

Dveri has been described as a right-wing, far-right, and radical-right party. It also has been described as nationalist, and conservative. Dveri has been also classified as a right-wing populist party, due to its opposition to illegal immigration, and euroscepticism. It is also supportive of economic nationalism, protectionism, and eco-nationalism. 

Dveri cooperates with the French party Reconquête, while it previously cooperated with the Alternative for Germany and United Russia.

Presidents of Dveri

Electoral performance

Parliamentary elections

Presidential elections

See also

Serbian nationalism
List of political parties in Serbia

References

External links
 

Conservative parties in Serbia
Eurosceptic parties in Serbia
Nationalist parties in Serbia
Organizations that oppose LGBT rights
Political parties established in 1999
1999 establishments in Serbia
Right-wing populism in Serbia
Eastern Orthodoxy and far-right politics
Serb nationalist parties
Eastern Orthodox political parties
Right-wing parties in Europe
Far-right politics in Serbia
Far-right parties in Europe
Monarchist parties in Serbia